Jonathan Rowell Burton (October 27, 1919 – May 29, 2019) was an American equestrian. He competed in two events at the 1956 Summer Olympics.

References

External links
 

1919 births
2019 deaths
American male equestrians
Olympic equestrians of the United States
Equestrians at the 1956 Summer Olympics
People from Berwyn, Illinois